The  was an anti-aircraft gun used in quantity by the Imperial Japanese Army during World War II.The Type 3 number was designated for the year the gun was accepted, 2603 in the Japanese imperial year calendar, or 1943 in the Gregorian calendar. It replaced the earlier Type 88 75 mm AA Gun in Japanese service.

History and development

In order to address the shortcomings of the Type 88 75 mm AA gun, the Army Technical Bureau developed a larger version with superior range, designated the Type 3. It was one of the few weapons in the Japanese inventory capable of reaching the USAAF B-29 Superfortress bombers that were attacking cities and other targets in the Japanese home islands. However, despite its superior range and firepower, the Type 3 gun could not be produced in sufficient quantities to be truly effective, due to costs, lack of raw materials and damage to Japan's industrial infrastructure by Allied air raids. Only 120 units were completed before production was discontinued, although the units produced continued to be used until the surrender of Japan.

Design

The Type 3 12 cm AA gun had a single piece gun barrel with sliding breech, mounted on a central pedestal. The firing platform was supported by five legs, each of which (along with the central pedestal) had adjustable screwed foot for leveling.

Combat record

Coming into service towards the end of the war, most of the Type 3s were retained on the home islands as part of the bolstering of Japan's defenses against Allied air raids and against the perceived threat of an Allied invasion. These guns were deployed to cover military targets around Tokyo, Osaka, Kobe and the Yawata Steel Works in Kitakyushu. Overseas, they were deployed to guard the oil fields at Palembang in the Netherlands East Indies Units in Tokyo were credited with downing at least ten B-29 bombers.

References

Notes

Bibliography
 Bishop, Chris (eds) The Encyclopedia of Weapons of World War II. Barnes & Nobel. 1998. 
 Chant, Chris. Artillery of World War II, Zenith Press, 2001, 
 McLean, Donald B. Japanese Artillery; Weapons and Tactics. Wickenburg, Ariz.: Normount Technical Publications 1973. .
 Mayer, S.L. The Rise and Fall of Imperial Japan. The Military Press (1884) 
 US Department of War, TM 30-480, Handbook on Japanese Military Forces, Louisiana State University Press, 1994. 
 War Department TM-E-30-480 Handbook on Japanese Military Forces September 1944

External links
Taki's Imperial Japanese Army

Artillery of Japan
World War II anti-aircraft guns
3
3
120 mm artillery
Weapons and ammunition introduced in 1943